Yuri Naumov (born May 3, 1962, Sverdlovsk, USSR) is a poet, composer, singer and acoustic guitar player, a unique Russian bluesman.

He was born into the family of a doctor. Naumov grew up listening to bootleg records of The Beatles and Led Zeppelin and at age 8 decided to become a rock guitarist. In 1970 he with his family moved to Novosibirsk. In 1978, while playing in a school-band, he met the future members of Kalinov Most, one of Russia's most influential indie-rock bands, also one of the creators of what is called Russian blues.

In January 1983 Naumov formed a band named Prokhodnoy Dvor, the line-up of which also included Vladimir Zotov (drums) and Oleg Kurokhtin (guitars). Soon, after a bootleg released by the band became popular in the USSR, KGB forced Naumov to leave Novosibirsk Medical University for "promulgation of decadent western values," and he sought safety first in Leningrad and later in Moscow. In 1990 Naumov moved to New York City, United States.

Naumov plays a unique 9-string guitar custom-built for him by famous violin maker Sergei Nozdrin in the 1980s.

Naumov usually once or twice a year tours in Russia.

Discography
 Escapist, 2019
 Rock Like Blues (Concert Film), 2008
 Russian Blues Live (Concert Album), 2006
 Born to Play (2 Discs, Live Album), 2004–2005
 Guitar Stories, 2001
 Violet Remastered, 2004 (Original release: 1996)
 Moscow Boogie (Live in Moscow), 2000 (Original Recording: April 27, 1994)
 Rolling Stone, 2003 (Original release: 1988)
 Unverifiable, 2002 (Original release: 1987)
 1000 Day Blues (Second Digital Edition), 2002 (Original release: 1986; 1st digital reissue: 1997)

See also 
  Williams, LG, The Book Of Yuri (PCP Press, 2017)

References

External links
 
 Official Site
 Official Site in Russian
 Interview with Yuri Naumov
Naumov at Zvuki.ru

1962 births
Living people
Acoustic guitarists
Russian male guitarists
20th-century Russian male singers
20th-century Russian singers
Russian rock singers
Musicians from Yekaterinburg
Soviet emigrants to the United States